The following is a list of railway border crossings of Turkey.

See also
Land border crossings of Turkey
Turkish State Railways
Kars–Gyumri–Tbilisi railway (Kars–Gymri section closed since 1993)
Baku–Tbilisi–Kars railway

References

Border crossings